Niranam is a village in Tiruvalla, Kerala, India. It was a port in ancient Kerala, on the confluence of the Manimala and Pamba River. It is almost 7  km from Tiruvalla SCS Junction in Pathanamthitta District of Kerala, lies to the western part of Tiruvalla, identified as Upper Kuttanad region. It Is Part Of Thiruvalla Sub-District.Also Comes Under Thiruvalla Constituency.It is identified with Nelcynda in Periplus of the Erythraean Sea.

Demographics 
Niranam is a large village located in the west of Tiruvalla, with 2837 families residing. The population of Niranam area is 10070, average sex ratio is 1118, higher than the state average of 1084. Niranam has a high literacy rate, 96.01%, higher than the state average of 94%.

History
Niranam is mentioned in the writings of Pliny and Cosmas Indicopleustes as a trade centre where pepper grows and is known to have a variety of different settlers from Greeks to Aryan Jains. Geologists suggest that the sea retracted from this area due to some major geographical changes.

The community were probably Jewish settlers and Brahmins who received baptism and became Christians. Due to the Coonan Cross Oath the Malankara Orthodox Church probably received more Christians from Cochin.

Niranam St Mary's Orthodox Cathedral has been the seat of the various Malankara metropolitans.

The Niranam poets, the "Kannassas" are credited to be pioneers in Malayalam bhakti literature, they authored Bhagavata, Ramayana, and Bharata in Malayalam. They lived in the 14th century CE. The great flood of 1341 AD helped to shift the sea westwards from silt filling in the direct sea route from Niranam.

Transport 
Niranam is a quiet place, lying between Kadapra to East and Neerettupuram to North. It can be approached through both the State Highway 12, and State Highway 6. The village lies west to Tiruvalla city centre, about 7 kilometres.

The railway station is about 8 km from Niranam, in Tiruvalla city, adjacent to the Mallappally Road, near Kuttappuzha RSPO.

The Thrikkapaleeshvara Temple 
Niranam, being an old settlement of both Brahmanic and Christian people, has a composite culture and historical buildings. This is a very old Shiva temple. Like the Sree Vallabha Temple, it also housed a Vedic school system. The temple is in a very old condition, and measures are taken to renovate it. It is believed to be one of the "108 Shiva Temples" established by Parasurama in Kerala by tradition.

Niranam Church (St Marys Orthodox church 
It is believed to be one of the oldest churches in Kerala and thus in India as well as among the oldest ones in the world. The architecture shows striking similarities to ancient temple architecture. It is a very important place for the Christians.Pattamukkil Tharavad at niranam is surrounded from three sides of niranam church. Priests From Pattamukkil families used to stay there and done priesthood and governed niranam church and its properties at the ancient days.

Geography
As a result of the flood of 1341, the soil of nearby areas of Niranam is still sandy and resembles beaches, though not close to the Arabian sea.

Notable people
Anna Rajam Malhotra Indian Administrative Service officer.
Niranam poets
Sosamma Iype, animal conservationist who won Padma Shri in 2022

Other places in Tiruvalla west 

 Kadapra
 Peringara
 Nedumpuram
 Neerettupuram
Chathenkery
 Erathodu

References

External links

St Thomas Art Gallery
St. Thomas Chapel (A congregational wing (Prayer Group) of St. Mary’s Orthodox church, Niranam)

Villages in Pathanamthitta district
Villages in Thiruvalla taluk
Christian missions in India